The Boys of Twilight is an American western drama series that aired on CBS from February 29 until March 21, 1992.

Plot
Set in Twilight, Utah, the series centered around aging Sheriff Cody McPherson (Farnsworth) and his Deputy Bill Huntoon (Brimley), who struggle with the influx of upwardly mobile professionals and city crime into their small town.

Cast
Richard Farnsworth as Sheriff Cody McPherson
Wilfred Brimley as Deputy Bill Huntoon
Ben Browder as Tyler Clare
Louise Fletcher as Genelva McPherson
Amanda McBroom as Suzanne Troxell

Production
Parts of the series were shot in Park City, Utah.

Episodes

References

External links
 

1990s American drama television series
1992 American television series debuts
1992 American television series endings
English-language television shows
CBS original programming
Television series by Sony Pictures Television
Television shows set in Utah